The 2021 NFL Draft was the 86th National Football League Draft, the annual meeting of National Football League (NFL) franchises to select newly eligible players for the 2021 NFL season. The draft was held in Cleveland from April 29 to May 1, 2021.

Five quarterbacks were selected in the first round — Trevor Lawrence, Zach Wilson, Trey Lance, Justin Fields, and Mac Jones — the second highest number of first-round quarterback selections (along with the 1999 and 2018 drafts) after the six selected in 1983. The draft also marked the third time the first three picks (Lawrence, Wilson, and Lance) were quarterbacks, following the 1971 and 1999 drafts. A total of eight quarterbacks were selected in the first three rounds, the most in NFL Draft history. Conversely, only two quarterbacks were taken in the remaining rounds.

In addition to the high number of quarterbacks, six Alabama players were taken in the first round, which is tied with the six Miami players in 2004 for the most from an individual school. Conversely, no Big 12 Conference players were drafted in the first round for the first time since the conference began play in 1996 and no Michigan State players were selected for the first time since 1941.

Scouts considered the later rounds of the draft lacking desirable prospects due to the COVID-19 pandemic shortening the 2020 college football season. The NCAA granted an extra year of eligibility and an opt-out option for athletes because of the shortened season, resulting in many prospects returning to school instead of declaring for the draft.

Host city bid process
The host city was chosen during the NFL Spring League Meeting on May 22, 2019. Cleveland and Kansas City were announced as the hosts for 2021 and 2023, respectively, from the remaining finalists from the 2019 draft after Las Vegas was chosen to host the 2020 event.

Player selections
The following is the breakdown of the 259 players selected by position:

 38 cornerbacks
 36 wide receivers
 33 defensive ends
 25 offensive tackles
 22 linebackers
 21 safeties
 19 defensive tackles
 18 running backs
 13 offensive guards
 11 tight ends
 10 quarterbacks
 8 centers
 2 long snappers
 1 fullback
 1 placekicker
 1 punter

Notable undrafted players

Trades
In the explanations below, (PD) indicates trades completed prior to the start of the draft (i.e. Pre-Draft), while (D) denotes trades that took place during the draft.

Round one

Round two

Round three

Round four

Round five

Round six

Round seven

2020 Resolution JC-2A picks 
In November 2020 the NFL passed that year's Resolution JC-2A, which rewards teams for developing minority candidates for head coach and/or general manager positions. The resolution rewards teams whose minority candidates are hired away for one of those positions by awarding draft picks. These draft picks are at the end of the third round, after standard compensatory picks; if multiple teams qualify, they are awarded in draft order from the first round. These picks are in addition to, and have no impact on, the standard 32 compensatory picks. Four picks have been awarded for the draft pursuant to the resolution.

Notes

Forfeited picks

Summary

Selections by NCAA conference

A new record-high 65 players were drafted from one conference, the most in NFL history, surpassing the previous number of selections, 64, in 2019. Both numbers were set by the Southeastern Conference.

Colleges with multiple draft selections

Selections by position

References
Trade references

General references

National Football League Draft
Draft
2020s in Cleveland
American football in Cleveland
NFL Draft
NFL Draft
Events in Cleveland
NFL Draft